Hellula simplicalis is a moth in the family Crambidae. It was described by Gottlieb August Wilhelm Herrich-Schäffer in 1871. It is found in Cuba.

References

Moths described in 1871
Glaphyriini
Moths of Cuba
Taxa named by Gottlieb August Wilhelm Herrich-Schäffer
Endemic fauna of Cuba